L. P. Piper was the head baseball coach of the LSU Tigers baseball team from 1900 to 1901. 

During his two seasons as head coach, he finished the season with an overall 8–6–1 record and  winning percentage. During the 1900 season, the Tigers finished with a 2–3–1 record. The 1901 team finished with a record of 6–3.

References
 

Baseball coaches from Louisiana
LSU Tigers baseball coaches